Bela fuscata is a species of sea snail, a marine gastropod mollusk in the family Mangeliidae.

Distribution
This species is found in European waters off the British Isles and Spain

References

External links
 Deshayes, G. P., 1835. Mollusques. Pp. 81-203, pl. 18-26, in Bory de Saint-Vincent J.B.G.M. (ed.), Expédition scientifique de Morée. Section des Sciences Physiques. Tome III. 1ere Partie. Zoologie. Première Section. Animaux vertébrés, Mollusques et Polypiers. Levrault, Paris
  Della Bella G., Naldi F. & Scarponi D. (2015). Molluschi marini del Plio-Pleistocene dell'Emilia-Romagna e della Toscana - Superfamiglia Conoidea, vol. 4, Mangeliidae II. Lavori della Società Italiana di Malacologia. 26: 1-80
 
  Tucker, J.K. 2004 Catalog of recent and fossil turrids (Mollusca: Gastropoda). Zootaxa 682:1-1295.
 MNHN, Paris: Bela fuscata

fuscata
Gastropods described in 1835